Aceh cattle or Acehnese cattle is a breed of cattle indigenous to the Aceh province of north Sumatra, Indonesia. It is one of the major domestic cattle breeds in Indonesia.

References

Beef cattle breeds
Cattle breeds originating in Indonesia